Bowringia is a genus of flowering plants in the legume family, found in west Africa. It belongs to the subfamily Faboideae. It was named after Sir John Bowring and his son, J. C. Bowring for their botanical work in China. Bowringia was traditionally assigned to the tribe Sophoreae; however, recent molecular phylogenetic analyses reassigned Bowringia to the Baphieae tribe.

Species
Bowringia comprises the following species:
 Bowringia callicarpa Champ. ex Benth.
 Bowringia discolor J.Hall
 Bowringia insignis Hook.
 Bowringia mildbraedii Harms

References

Baphieae
Fabaceae genera